The Order of May (in Spanish: Orden de Mayo) is an order of merit and one of the highest decorations in Argentina. The order is named after the May Revolution which led to the birth of the Republic of Argentina. It was founded as the Order of Merit, and revised to its current form on 17 December 1957.

History
The Order of May was created as an Order of Merit by Decree No. 8506/46, 1946. In 1957, the rules of the order were modified and the Order of Merit was renamed the Order of May by Decree No. 16,629. The order was further divided into the categories of Merit, of Military Merit, of Naval Merit, and of Aeronautical Merit.

In 1958, the regulation was further amended and the Collar of (Civil) Merit category (the highest in the order at that time) was abolished, and it is currently only a military honour.

Grades

The Grades are:
Knight
Officer
Commander
Grand Officer
Grand Cross
The grade Collar was abolished in 1958.

Recipients 

 Hugo Biermann
 George Bolton (banker)
 Gustaf Bonde (1911–1977)
 Cristóbal Colón de Carvajal, 17th Duke of Veragua
 Vern Clark
 Carl-George Crafoord
 Robert E. Cushman Jr.
 Jorge Fernández Maldonado Solari
 Walter Hallstein
 James L. Holloway III
 Rafael Hoyos Rubio
 Rick Jolly
 Vilma Socorro Martínez
 Cruz Melchor Eya Nchama
 Enrique Olivares Santana
 Elmo Zumwalt
 Grand Crosses
 Cristian Barros
 Bohuslav Chnoupek
 Jacques Diouf
 Felive VI of Spain
 Tim Fischer
 Licelott Marte de Barrios

See also 
Argentine Nation to the Valour in Combat Medal
List of military decorations

References 

Orders, decorations, and medals of Argentina
May, Order of
Awards established in 1957
1957 establishments in Argentina